Hanggang Makita Kang Muli is a 2016 Philippine television drama series broadcast by GMA Network. It premiered on the network's Afternoon Prime line up and worldwide on GMA Pinoy TV from March 7, 2016 to July 15, 2016 replacing Buena Familia.

Mega Manila and Urban Luzon ratings are provided by AGB Nielsen Philippines.

Series overview

Episodes

March 2016

April 2016

May 2016

June 2016

July 2016

References

Lists of Philippine drama television series episodes